Government Medical College in Konni, Pathanamthitta is the seventh government medical college in Kerala.

Location 
The Medical college is situated on Nedumpara  hill  near Vattamon in Konni taluk, Pathanamthitta District.The construction is completed.

History 
The foundation stone for the Konni Government Medical College in Pathanamthitta district was laid on 26 January 2013 by Oommen Chandy, the then Chief Minister of Kerala. The campus had  of land which was received by the Soil Conservation Department at Vattamon in Aruvappulam grama panchayat. The Budget was Rs 200 crore, which includes the State Government's budget allocation and the credit taken from NABARD, for the construction work in the first phase of the project. On 14 September 2020, Chief Minister Pinarayi Vijayan inaugurated the Medical College hospital. The inpatient capacity will be 300.

The college is expected to admit 50 students per year from 2021 for MBBS course, on getting the approval of the medical council.

References

External links
Official website

Medical colleges in Kerala
Universities and colleges in Pathanamthitta district
Konni